Runaway is the name of two works by Kanye West:

 Runaway (Kanye West song), 2010
 Runaway (2010 film)